Events in the year 1918 in Belgium.

Incumbents
Monarch: Albert I
Prime Minister: Charles de Broqueville (to 1 June); Gérard Cooreman (from 1 June)

Events
 7 to 29 April – Fourth Battle of Ypres
 23 April – Zeebrugge Raid
 28 September to 2 October – Fifth Battle of Ypres
 14 to 19 October – Battle of Courtrai
 18 October – Yser Medal struck
 19 October – Charge of Burkel
 20 October to 11 November – Battle of the Lys and the Escaut
 5 to 7 November – Passage of the Grande Honnelle
 11 November – Armistice of 11 November 1918

Publications
Newspapers
 Vers l'Avenir begins publication (18 November)
 De Standaard begins publication (4 December)

Books
 A War Nurse's Diary: Sketches from a Belgian Field Hospital (New York, Macmillan)
 Henri Grégoire, Les Perles de la poésie slave: Lermontov, Pouchkine, Mickiewicz (Liège, Bénard)
 Emile Vandervelde, Three Aspects of The Russian Revolution, translated by Jean A. H. Findlay (London, George Allen and Unwin)

Births
 26 January – Albert Sercu, cyclist (died 1978)
 17 February – Frans Cools cyclist (died 1999)
 24 February – Louisa Colpeyn, actress (died 2015)
 3 March – Fernand Buyle, footballer (died 1992)
 23 April – André Maelbrancke, cyclist (died 1986)
 2 May – Georges Debunne, trade unionist (died 2008)
 5 May – Karel Thijs, cyclist (died 1990)
 17 May – Eugénie De Keyser, art historian (died 2012)
 26 May – Prosper Depredomme, cyclist (died 1987)
 28 June – Anton van Wilderode, poet (died 1998)
 8 September – Robert Senelle, academic (died 2013)
 19 September – Hubert Chantrenne, scientist (died 2007)
 24 September – Joseph Trimpont, wrestler
 1 October – Jan Cools, Olympic wrestler
 4 October – Raymond Lombard, Olympic equestrian
 6 October – André Pilette, racing driver (died 1993)
 28 November – Gustaaf Eeckeman, footballer (died 1975)

Deaths
 12 January – Émile Storms (born 1846), colonial official
 19 February – Edmond Deman (born 1857), publisher
 21 February – Théophile de Lantsheere (born 1833), politician
 14 March – Gennaro Rubino (born 1859), anarchist
 31 August – Joe English (born 1882), artist
 17 September – Henry Moeller (born 1852), priest
 28 December – Géo Bernier (born 1862), painter

References

 
1910s in Belgium